Minnesota Street Project (MSP), is a dual for-profit/foundation model art space founded in 2016 in the Dogpatch neighborhood of San Francisco, California; and features 13 art galleries, an event space, and a restaurant.

History 
Minnesota Street Project was founded in 2016 by venture capitalist Andy Rappaport, and Deborah Rappaport. The Minnesota Street Project Foundation (founded in 2019), and the California Black Voices Project and Grants for Arts Equity (founded in 2021), are two grant programs born from this project, created to “begin addressing the systemic racism in the art world”.

Minnesota Street Project is a three building complex, with 35,000 square feet of gallery space; they also offer subsidized art studio space at 1240 Minnesota Street (just across the street). The gallery space features an atrium, the building was designed by Jensen architects. 

Galleries represented in the space have included Anglim/Trimble, Rena Bransten Gallery, bitforms gallery, Casemore Kirkeby, Adrian Rosenfeld, and Jack Fischer Gallery. The space has been the event host of the annual Fog Design + Art Fair, and the annual San Francisco Art Book Fair (launched in 2016).

See also 

 Institute of Contemporary Art San Francisco

References

External link 

 Official website

Art museums and galleries in San Francisco
Arts organizations based in the San Francisco Bay Area
Culture of San Francisco
2016 establishments in California
Arts organizations established in 2016
Art in San Francisco
Potrero Hill, San Francisco